Tereschenko Palace is a palace, now a school, in Andrushivka, Zhytomyr Oblast, Ukraine. 

It was built in 1871 by Artemy Tereshchenko, a sugar baron of the wealthy Tereshchenko family of entrepreneurs who owned the Andrushivka Sugar Factory. It is a brick palace set in a park, built in the style of French Renaissance Revival architecture. 

On 25 January 1919 a meeting was held here by the Volyn Revolutionary Committee, and in June 1920 in these walls housed the headquarters of the First Mounted Army. On one of the palace's balconies, the Soviet Commander addressed citizens of Andrushivka in a memorable speech. 

It was renovated and extended in 1975 and a second floor built over the greenhouse. The interior has the original marble stairs, and the remains of the ancient Greek style ornament on the wall. There is also a preserved old desk used by Tereshchenko. Near the palace there are outbuildings, stables and other buildings and to the rear of the palace is a great fountain of unknown origin.

References

Palaces in Ukraine
Andrushivka
Buildings and structures in Zhytomyr Oblast
Houses completed in 1871
Tereshchenko family
Renaissance Revival architecture in Ukraine